Kenneth John Thorneycroft (March 24, 1928 – May 4, 2018) was a Canadian Forces Air Command officer. He served as deputy commander of NORAD from 1980 to 1983. He died in 2018.

References

Canadian Forces Air Command generals
1928 births
2018 deaths
Canadian military personnel from Saskatchewan